The South West Peninsula is the area of England between the Bristol Channel to the north and the English Channel to the south.  It is part of the South West region of England, and includes the counties of Cornwall, Devon, and (depending on its precise definition) all or part of the counties of Somerset and Dorset.

Current usage
Some official bodies such as the Met Office, use the term. The South West Peninsula Football League, which covers Devon and Cornwall, uses the name. The region's postgraduate NHS Deanery, South West Peninsula Postgraduate Medical Education, uses the term.

Past usage
The Peninsula College of Medicine and Dentistry, a medical school established by the University of Exeter and Plymouth University which operated between 2000 and 2013, referred to it,  as did the South West Peninsula Strategic Health Authority before its 2006 demise.

Limits

Land's End is the westernmost point of the peninsula and of England.  The eastern limit may be defined as the  isthmus between the mouth of the river Parrett and Lyme Bay.

See also
West Country

References

Peninsulas of England
.
.
Landforms of Cornwall
Landforms of Devon
Landforms of Somerset
Southern England